Naseriyeh (also Romanized as Nāşerīyeh) is a village in Gonbaki Rural District, Gonbaki District, Rigan County, Kerman Province, Iran. At the 2006 census, its population was 345, in 61 families.

References 

Populated places in Rigan County